Savukku is an anonymous, whistle blowing website. The website has been called the Tamil's WikiLeaks. The site publishes articles in Tamil and English. It is known for leaking sensational 2G spectrum case taped conversation and publishing articles on corrupt government employees, politicians, judges, journalists and socio-political affairs. It is believed to be run by Savukku Shankar alias achimuthu shankar, a former lower division clerk in the Directorate of Vigilance and Anti-corruption. On 28 February 2014, the website was blocked on Madras High Court orders after a writ for defamation was filed by a Sun TV employee, Mahalakshmi. In a different matter, Shankar was charged under Sections 66, 70 and 72 of the Information Technology Act, alleged to have leaked the conversation between former Chief Secretary to Government and former Director of Vigilance and Anti-Corruption. He was acquitted on 24 February 2017.

Overview

The website publishes articles anonymously, they say, about corrupt government employees, politicians, judges and journalists. It was started in September 2010. It does not give any information about the owner(s) or the publisher(s) of posts on website but is said to have been run by Achimuthu Shankar, a former lower division clerk in the Directorate of Vigilance and Anti-corruption. In 2008, Shankar allegedly leaked the transcript of a taped conversation between S. K. Upadhyay, then director of DVAC, and L. K. Tripathi, then chief secretary of the state to the Deccan Chronicle English daily newspaper. He was found guilty and arrested and was allegedly subjected to third-degree torture to swear against some officers. After being released on bail, he started collecting information through Right to information act, and later made a blog post to make public the information he has gathered. It allegedly led to the second arrest of Shankar, but on charges of road rage. Thereafter he converted his blog into a website called, Savukku to expose corruption.

The first blog post was published anonymously on the website in September 2010 and it presently has around 960 posts since then including the 2G taped conversation.

In 2010-2011, when Aam Aadmi Party leader and senior advocate Prashant Bhushan released the tapes of alleged conversation between Dravida Munnetra Kazhagam Rajya Sabha member Kanimozhi and the then Tamil Nadu police chief of intelligence, Jaffar Sait, it was said to have made public by the website three days earlier.

On 1 February 2014, the website had publicly posted four tapes exposing the conversation between Kanimozhi and former additional director general of police Jaffer Sait and between Jaffer Sait and Sharad Kumar Reddy, a former director of Kalaignar TV owned by Karunanidhi. The authenticity of the taped conversation has not yet been challenged by either Kanimozhi or Dravida Munnetra Kazhagam party.

Block
Mahalakshmi, an advocate and Sun TV newsreader had lodged a defamation case against the website for writing about her personal life, that she claimed have degraded her reputation. She later filed a writ petition in the Madras High Court citing inactivity of the police.

On 28 February 2014, the Madras High Court ordered the Joint Secretary, Cyber Law Division of Union Department of Information Technology to block the website within ten days and called other affected individuals to lodge separate police cases, on hearing the writ petition filed by Mahalakshmi. The court said that,

On 2 March 2014, following the court orders to block the website, many proxies were created to evade the block. The website continued to host mirrors of the site Savukku, this time naming the Judge of the Madras High Court who is hearing the case.

Achimuthu Shankar
Achimuthu Shankar, alias Savukku Shankar is a former lower division clerk in the Directorate of Vigilance and Anti-corruption, which he joined in 1991. In 2008, he allegedly made public sensational information which included taped conversation between S. K. Upadhyay, then Director of Directorate of Vigilance and Anti-corruption, and L. K. Tripathi, then Chief Secretary, through the Deccan Chronicle English daily newspaper. Following the leak of sensitive information in public, the then Dravida Munnetra Kazhagam government of the Tamil Nadu state appointed a commission headed by Judge P. Shanmugam to probe the leak. Shankar was found guilty by the commission of inquiry. However, Shankar denied the allegations and said, charges were false and he was contesting them in courts. He also said that, he was made to face the third degree torture and was forced to bear witness against some officials. He was later released on bail.

In mid-2010, He published a blog post of information collected through the Right to information act and he was arrested on the charges of road rage next day. He said, "The next day I was arrested on some false charges of road rage. I was expecting them to [arrest me]. They did not disappoint".

He later upgraded his blog into a website after receiving encouragement by readers. In 2011, the Dravida Munnetra Kazhagam government lost the polls to form the government. Shankar opined, even though the new government, many stuffs related to social welfare still do not reach to public. He said,

Shankar is an admirer of V. Prabhakaran, chief of LTTE. The website had a picture of V. Prabhakaran on one side and a picture of a cowboy with a whip on the other side of the header. He continued to publish articles along with contesting the suspension of him from Department of Vigilance and Anti-corruption. He is called the Tamil's Julian Assange.

The website was the first to release the 2G tapes ahead of Prasant Bushan. An audio of conversation between, Kalaignar TV MD, Sharad Kumar and former TN Intelligence Chief Jaffer Sait IPS.

The website was the first to expose the arithmetical errors in the judgment of Justice CR Kumarasamy, acquitting Selvi Jayalalitha, CM of Tamil Nadu in the month of May 2015

Arrests
On 31 January 2014, A Puducherry-based web designer Murugaiyan was arrested by the Cyber Crime Police of Chennai for designing the website. After 21 days of imprisonment, Murugaiyan was released on bail by the Madras High Court.

On 24 July 2014, Following the Madras High Court orders, Central Crime Branch arrested Pothi Kalimuthu on charge of hosting the website. He allegedly did own the website domain located in France and maintained a server located in Singapore for the website. The CCB officers had to make a request to the France Telecom through the Department of Telecommunications to reveal the address of the owner of the website domain.

In a conversation, Achimuthu Shankar said to Indian Express English newspaper that, he met Kalimuthu online. Kalimuthu offered his help with making of new website after the original website was blocked on court orders and refused to take money for hosting the website.

On 15 Sept 2022, the Madras High court sentenced Savukku Shankar to six months in jail, finding him guilty of contempt of court, for his remarks made in Red Pix on July 22, where he claimed that the “entire higher judiciary is plagued by corruption”. While he was in jail, on 10 Nov 2022, just a day earlier to his Supreme Court hearing, 4 other pending cases were charged on him by the Chennai Central Crime Branch’s Cyber Crime wing, 3 of those cases were registered in 2020, while 1 was registered in 2021. The initial contempt of court verdict was suspended by the Supreme Court, on 11 Nov 2022. On 19 Nov 2022, he was released from Cuddalore Central Prison on bail in all 4 cases.

Protest
Professor A., a human rights activist said that, one may not necessarily agree with the contents posted by the website but the blocking the website is unacceptable. The affected individuals are free to take legal action separately.

P. Sundarajan, a lawyer opined that, this is most unfortunate, and the particular Judge should refrain himself from hearing the case because he was also written about by the website and this order is nothing but a mockery of justice.

Citizens for Freedom of Expression, an organisation comprising senior advocates and activists said that they will prosecute in the case on behalf of the website and said that, the court order is a serious threat to freedom of expression.

A former BBC Tamil employee T.N. Gopalan filed a PIL in the Madras High Court, requesting the court to resist government from blocking the website except in the case described in the Information Technology Rules, 2009. Gopalan said that, he was not expecting the block on website which has discovered several scams and investigates and publishes information in public welfare.

J. Anbazhgan, president of Chennai Union of Journalists said that the union believes that the complaint filed by Mahalakhsmi is not accurate and is related to the ownership of 2G tapes by Shankar and a representative from the union has met the chief minister J. Jayalalitha, to provide relief to Shankar.

Acquittal
Savukku Shankar was acquitted by the XVII Additional Sessions Court Chennai on 24 February 2017. Shankar was charged under Sections 66, 70 and 72 of the Information Technology Act and was alleged to have leaked the conversation between former Chief Secretary to Government and former Director of Vigilance and Anti-Corruption.

References

Information sensitivity
Whistleblowing
2010 establishments in India
Internet properties established in 2010
Indian whistleblowers
Indian news websites
Internet censorship in India